Tafadzwa Mpofu (born 9 May 1985) is a Zimbabwean cricketer. He made his first-class debut for Midlands cricket team in the 2003–04 Logan Cup on 9 April 2004.

References

External links
 

1985 births
Living people
Zimbabwean cricketers
Centrals cricketers
Midlands cricketers
Sportspeople from Kwekwe